Ore'q (Yurok: 'O'rekw  ) is a former Yurok settlement in Humboldt County, California. It lay at an elevation of 30 feet (9 m). The town of Orick, California keeps the name alive in nearly the same place today.

References

Former settlements in Humboldt County, California
Former Native American populated places in California
Yurok villages